Sara Lindborg (born 30 November 1983) is a Swedish cross-country skier who has competed since 2002. Her best World Cup finish was second twice, both in the 4 × 5 km relay in France (2006, 2008). Lindborg's best individual finish was 12th in a 10 km event in Estonia in 2007.

At the FIS Nordic World Ski Championships 2007 in Sapporo, she finished 16th in the 30 km, 24th in the 10 km, and 31st in the 7.5 km + 7.5 km double pursuit events.

Cross-country skiing results
All results are sourced from the International Ski Federation (FIS).

Olympic Games

World Championships

World Cup

Season standings

Team podiums
 1 victory – (1 ) 
 4 podiums – (4 )

References

External links

1983 births
Living people
Swedish female cross-country skiers
Tour de Ski skiers
Cross-country skiers at the 2014 Winter Olympics
Olympic cross-country skiers of Sweden
People from Falun
21st-century Swedish women